The 15th Hong Kong Awards ceremony, honored the best films of 1995 and took place on 28 April 1996 at Hong Kong Academy for Performing Arts, Wan Chai, Hong Kong. The ceremony was hosted by Sandra Ng, Dayo Wong and Veronica Yip, during the ceremony awards are presented in 15 categories.

Awards
Winners are listed first, highlighted in boldface, and indicated with a double dagger.

References

 Official website of the Hong Kong Film Awards

1996
1995 film awards
1996 in Hong Kong